Gabès – Matmata International Airport  is an airport serving Gabès, the capital of the Gabès Governorate in the centre-east of Tunisia.

Airlines and destinations

References

External links
 Tunisian Civil Aviation and Airports Authority (OACA)
 
 

Airports in Tunisia